Vittorio Magnii (8 December 1918 – 4 April 2010) was an Italian racing cyclist. He rode in the 1948 Tour de France.

References

External links
 

1918 births
2010 deaths
People from Fucecchio
Italian male cyclists
Sportspeople from the Metropolitan City of Florence
Cyclists from Tuscany